This is a list of Taça de Portugal winning football managers.

Albano Paulo led Académica to victory in the inaugural final of the contest.

Otto Glória and José Maria Pedroto have won the tournament on four occasions while János Biri and Fernando Vaz guided their teams to the trophy on three occasions. Otto Glória was the first manager to have won the competition with two different clubs, a feat later achieved by Fernando Vaz, José Maria Pedroto, Jimmy Hagan and Rui Vitória.

Eight managers led their teams to consecutive wins in the tournament: János Biri (1943 & 1944), Cândido de Oliveira (1946 & 1948), Ted Smith (1949 & 1951) Mário Lino (1973 & 1974), John Mortimore (1986 & 1987), Fernando Santos (2000 & 2001), Paulo Bento (2007 & 2008) and Jesualdo Ferreira (2009 & 2010). José Maria Pedroto is the only manager to have won three times in a row (1975–1977).

Fourteen men have won the tournament both as a player and as a manager, namely Fernando Caiado, Juca, José Maria Pedroto, José Augusto, Mário Lino, António Morais, João Alves, Artur Jorge, Toni, António Oliveira, António Sousa, Paulo Bento, Pedro Emanuel and Sérgio Conceição.

Winning managers

Managers with multiple titles

By nationality

Notes

See also

 List of Taça da Liga winning managers
 List of Supertaça Cândido de Oliveira winning managers

References

 
Taça de Portugal